The Kowree-Naracoorte-Tatiara Football League is an Australian rules football competition based in the Limestone Coast region of South Australia, Australia.  It is an affiliated member of the South Australian National Football League.  One unusual aspect of the league is that it includes clubs from both South Australia and Victoria. The 2018/19/20/21 league medalist was Darcy “Sauce” Boyanton.

Kowree-Naracoorte-Tatiara Football League

In 1993 the Kowree-Naracoorte Football League and the Tatiara Football League merged to form the Kowree-Naracoorte-Tatiara Football League.  The founding clubs were Apsley, Border Districts, Bordertown, Edenhope, Kaniva & Districts, Keith, Kingston, Kybybolite, Leeor, Lucindale, Mundulla, Naracoorte, Padthaway and Penola.

Kaniva & Districts and Leeor merged in 1997 to form Kaniva Leeor United.

Apsley and Edenhope in 1999 merged to form Edenhope-Apsley and in 2006 moved to the Horsham & District Football League.

Current clubs

Former clubs

History

Kowree-Naracoorte FL

Kowree-Naracoorte FL was founded in 1937.

KNFL Premiers

 1950	Edenhope
 1951	Kybybolite
 1952	Apsley
 1953	Naracoorte
 1954	Naracoorte
 1955	Apsley
 1956	Kybybolite
 1957	Edenhope
 1958	Edenhope
 1959	Naracoorte
 1960	Edenhope
 1961	Kybybolite
 1962	Border Districts
 1963	Naracoorte
 1964	Naracoorte

 1965	Apsley
 1966	Kybybolite
 1967	Border Districts
 1968	Kybybolite
 1969	Lucindale
 1970	Lucindale
 1971	Edenhope
 1972	Edenhope
 1973	Kybybolite
 1974	Kybybolite
 1975	Border Districts
 1976	Border Districts
 1977	Naracoorte
 1978	Naracoorte
 1979	Border Districts

 1980	Border Districts
 1981	Border Districts
 1982	Kingston
 1983	Kingston
 1984	Kingston
 1985	Apsley
 1986	Edenhope
 1987	Edenhope
 1988	Edenhope
 1989	Penola
 1990	Penola
 1991	Border Districts
 1992	Naracoorte

Tatiara FL

Tatiara FL was founded in 1911.

TFL Premiers

 1921	Mundulla
 1922	Bordertown
 1923	Bordertown
 1924	Kaniva
 1925	Mundulla
 1926	Bordertown
 1927	Mundulla
 1928	Kaniva
 1929	Mundulla
 1930	Mundulla
 1931	Mundulla
 1932	Mundulla
 1933	Serviceton
 1934	Mundulla
 1935	Kaniva

 1936	Serviceton
 1937	Mundulla
 1938	Mundulla
 1939	Bordertown
 1940	Goroke
 1946	Serviceton
 1947	Lillimur
 1948	Mundulla
 1949	Bordertown
 1950	Leeor
 1951	Mundulla
 1952	Leeor
 1953	Kaniva
 1954	Keith
 1955	Keith

 1956	Kaniva
 1957	Bordertown
 1958	Kaniva
 1959	Mundulla
 1960	Kaniva
 1961	Kaniva
 1962	Keith
 1963	Kaniva
 1964	Kaniva
 1965	Kaniva
 1966	Leeor
 1967	Bordertown
 1968	Bordertown
 1969	Kaniva
 1970	Kaniva

 1971	Bordertown
 1972	Bordertown
 1973	Mundulla
 1974	Leeor
 1975	Bordertown
 1976	Bordertown
 1977	Tintinara
 1978	Keith
 1979	Keith
 1980	Keith
 1981	Keith
 1982	Keith
 1983	Mundulla
 1984	Bordertown
 1985	Kaniva

 1986	Bordertown
 1987	Bordertown
 1988	Mundulla
 1989	Mundulla
 1990	Bordertown
 1991	Mundulla
 1992	Bordertown

2007 Ladder

2008 Ladder

2009 Ladder

2010 Ladder

2011 Ladder

2012 Ladder

2013 Ladder

2014 Ladder

2015 Ladder

2016 Ladder

2017 Ladder

KNTFL A Grade Premierships

1993   Padthaway
1994   Mundulla
1995   Mundulla
1996   Mundulla
1997   Mundulla
1998   Mundulla
1999   Mundulla
2000   Mundulla
2001   Penola
2002   Mundulla

2003   Penola
2004   Mundulla
2005   Lucindale
2006   Naracoorte
2007   Keith
2008   Keith
2009   Naracoorte
2010   Naracoorte
2011   Lucindale
2012   Bordertown

2013   Penola 
2014   Padthaway
2015   Padthaway
2016   Penola
2017   Lucindale
2018   Mundulla
2019   Mundulla
2021   Mundulla
2022   Lucindale

Medalists

Virgo Medal
1993   Ashley Grant, Kaniva

Mail Medal
1993   Bernie Mulraney, Edenhope

Mail Medalists & Virgo Medalists (Combined in 1994)
1994   Richard Gould, Lucindale
1995   Terry Woodall, Keith
1996   Phil Forster, Naracoorte
1997   Jamie Walker, Penola
1998   Tim Beacham, Apsley
1999   Simon Beggs, Kingston
2000   Simon Beggs, Kingston
2001   Ben Fennell, Penola
2002   Aaron Smart and Phil Smith, Lucindale
2003   Lindsay Smith, Bordertown
2004   Heath Thorpe, Mundulla
2005   Nigel Fiegert, Lucindale
2006   Hamish Tamlin, Keith
2007   Matt Gill, Naracoorte
2008   Mark Snowball, Lucindale
2009   Adam Pitt, Lucindale
2010   Luke Duncan, Penola
2011   Craig Beggs, Naracoorte
2012   Jared Greenbank, Kaniva Leoor
2013   Dylan Coxon, Penola
2014   Ben McIntyre, Penola
2015   Ben Simounds, Keith
2016   Ryan McInerney, Lucindale  
2017   Simon Berkefeld, Penola    
2018   George Thring and Tim McIntyre, Keith/Mundulla
2019   Scott Spriggs, Lucindale   
2021   Mark Quinn, Border Districts   
2022   Rory Taggert, Naracoorte

Leading Goalkickers

1993   Andrew Zealand, Padthaway    76
1994   Roger Gibbs, Penola          78
1995   Roger Gibbs, Penola          94
1996   Matthew Jess, Edenhope       112
1997   Roger Gibbs, Penola          106
1998   Eric Martin, Keith           85
1999   Phil Pedler, Border Districts 103
2000   Nick Williams, Mundulla      85
2001   Jamie Walker, Penola         108
2002   Phil Smith, Lucindale        129

2003   Jamie Walker, Penola         136
2004   Tim Leach, Mundulla          98
2005   Phil Smith, Lucindale        127
2006   Stuart Cooper, Kingston      137
2007   Stuart Cooper, Kingston      105
2008   Nigel Fiegert, Lucindale 99
2009   Sam Logan, Naracoorte        108
2010   Heath Thorpe, Mundulla       97
2011   Simon Cox, Naracoorte        101
2012   Ben Gunning, Padthaway       66

2013   Adam Merrett, Penola         108
2014  Adam Merritt, Penola	120
2015 Ben Simound , Keith    105
2016 Gene Robinson, Bordertown  78
2017 Scott Carberry, Kybyybolite	76
2018 Ben Simound , Keith    91
2019 Michael Wundke, Kaniva Leeor  66
2021 Tobin Cox, Padthaway  69
2022 Rory Taggert, Naracoorte 66

Notable players from the area

The KNFL, TFL and KNTFL have produced:
 Aaron Fiora, Naracoorte
 John Hinge, Mitch Hinge Mundulla
 Michael Taylor, Daniel Bell, Kingston
 Glenn Hawker, Ashley Coutts, Roger Merrett and Alastair Clarkson, Kaniva,
 Jack Redden, Simon Cox Keith
 Jack Trengove, Alex Forster, Lachie Neale, Kybybolite
 Reg Burgess, Apsley
 Phil Carman, Edenhope
 Stephen Copping, Andrew McKay, Darcy Fogarty, Will Gould Lucindale
 Lincoln McCarthy, Lindsay Smith, David Grenvold Bordertown

Additionally some famous SANFL and AFL footballers have played in the league, including: 
 Tony Modra, Sudjai Cook - Keith
 Barrie Barbary, Ray Whittaker, Peter Woite - Kybybolite
 Nigel Fiegert, Steven Brosnan, Phil Smith, Tom Logan - Lucindale
 Donald Dickie, Bernie Vince, Daniel Hargraves - Border Districts
 Simon Cox, Chris Ladhams Jack Trengove - Naracoorte
 Steven Sims, Scott Welsh, Ian Perrie, Justin Cicolella, Wade Thompson - Padthaway
 Cameron Hitchcock - Kaniva
 Matthew Lloyd - Penola

References

External links 
 The Official Kowree-Naracoorte-Tatiara Football League website
 Footypedia - KNTFL
 country footy
 Full Points Footy - KNTFL

Books
 Encyclopedia of South Australian country football clubs / compiled by Peter Lines. 
 South Australian country football digest / by Peter Lines 

Australian rules football competitions in South Australia
Australian rules football competitions in Victoria (Australia)